The 2016 NC State Wolfpack football team represented North Carolina State University in the 2016 NCAA Division I FBS football season. They played their home games at Carter–Finley Stadium in Raleigh, North Carolina. It was their fourth season under head coach Dave Doeren. They were a member of the Atlantic Division of the Atlantic Coast Conference.

Schedule

Source:

Game summaries

William & Mary

at East Carolina

Old Dominion

Wake Forest

Notre Dame

The Notre Dame vs NC State game was played during Hurricane Matthew where the two teams combined for only 311 total yards. The only touchdown of the game was scored by NC State on a blocked punt by Pharaoh Mckever leading NC State to win it 10-3.

at Clemson

at Louisville

Boston College

Florida State

at Syracuse

Miami (FL)

at North Carolina

Vanderbilt–Independence Bowl

Coaching staff

References

NC State
NC State Wolfpack football seasons
Independence Bowl champion seasons
NC State Wolfpack football